Rivero is a surname. Notable people with the surname include:
Andrés Rivero Agüero (1905 – 1996), Cuban politician and prime minister
Ángel Rivero Méndez (1856 – 1930), Puerto Rican soldier, writer, journalist and a businessman
Armando Rivero (born 1988), Cuban baseball player
Bernardo Rivero (1889 – 1965), Peruvian painter
Calu Rivero (born 1987), Argentine model and actress
Carlos Rivero (disambiguation)
Claudia Rivera (born 1986), Peruvian badminton player
Claudio Rivero (born 1985), Uruguayan footballer
Cristian Rivero (born 1978), Peruvian television host and actor
Dante Rivero (born 1946), Filipino actor
Diego Rivero (born 1981), Argentine football midfielder
Diosbert Rivero (born 2000), Venezuelan footballer
Edmundo Rivero (1911 - 1986), Argentine musician
Felipe Rivero (born 1991), Venezuelan professional baseball pitcher
Gabriela Rivero (born 1964), Mexican actress and singer
Horacio Rivero, Jr. (1910 – 2000), the first Puerto Rican and Hispanic four-star Admiral in the U.S. Navy
Ignacio Rivero (born 1992), Uruguayan footballer
Inés Rivero (born 1975), Argentinian model
Jennifer Ramírez Rivero (1978–2018), Venezuelan model and businesswoman
Jorge Rivero (born 1938), Mexican actor
José Rivero (born 1955), Spanish professional golfer
José Ignacio Rivero (1920 – 2011), Cuban exile and journalist 
Juan A. Rivero (1923 – 2014), Puerto Rican biologist 
Juncal Rivero (born 1966), Spanish beauty queen, model and actress
Lovely Rivero (born 1969), Filipino actress
Martín Rivero (born 1989), Argentine footballer
Mirtha Rivero (born 1956), Venezuelan journalist and writer.
Octavio Rivero (born 1992), Uruguayan footballer
Paulino Rivero (born 1952), Spanish politician 
Quique Rivero (born 1992), Spanish footballer
Ramón Rivero (1909 – 1956), Puerto Rican comedian, actor, and composer
Raúl Rivero (1945 – 2021), Cuban poet, journalist, and dissident
Ricci Rivero (born 1998), Filipino basketball player
Rolando Rivero (born 1944), Mexican politician
Ronald Rivero (born 1980), Bolivian footballer
Sebastian Rivero (born 1998), Venezuelan baseball player
Toni Rivero (born 1988), taekwondo Olympian from the Philippines 
Viviana Rivero (born 1966), Argentine writer

fr:Rivero